McCubbins is a surname. Notables with the surname include:

Chris McCubbins (1945–2009), American runner
Mathew D. McCubbins (1956–2021), American political scientist

See also
Limberbutt McCubbins (born 2010), a cat registered as a candidate for the 2016 United States presidential election
McCubbin